Lodovico Migliore, nicknamed Ico (born 1956), is an Italian architect, designer, professor and former professional ice hockey player. He is professor at the School of Design of the Polytechnic University of Milan and he is Chair Professor of the College of Design at Busan Dongseo University in South Korea. He served as chairman of Hockey Milano Rossoblu, an ice hockey team in Elite.A based out of Milan, Italy from 2010 to 2016. He also competed in the men's tournament at the 1984 Winter Olympics.

Biography 
Ico Migliore started playing ice hockey in Turin, He first joined the Valpellice team, and then he played three seasons for those of Bolzano and Varese.  In the meantime, he received his degree in architecture from  Polytechnic University of Turin under the supervision of Professor Achille Castiglioni. He started working with Castiglioni at Polytechnic University of Milan where he moved in 1986, and played for Milan Saiman as the captain of the team until 1990.

In 1997 he co-founded, with Mara Servetto, Migliore + Servetto Architects, an architecture firm which creates, together with an international team of architects and designers, projects on various scales: from architecture to interior design; from urban design to temporary exhibitions; from museum to communication projects. These projects, diversified as they are, create innovative places that have a major impact on people. Architectures, interior and exhibition design projects characterized by an expressive use of light and new technologies.

He is professor at the Polytechnic University of Milan (School of Design). He is also Chair Professor of the College of Design at Busan Dongseo University in South Korea.

He has been awarded many international prizes, such as the XXI (2008), XXIII (2014), XXV (2018) ADI Compasso d’Oro (Ita), five Honorable Mentions ADI Compasso d’Oro (Ita), eleven Red Dot Design Award (Ger), two German Design Award (Ger), two FX Interior Design Award (UK), the Annual Exhibit Design Award (US), two International Design Award (US) and the ASAL Exhibition Design of the Year (Ita).

Ico Migliore has been a member of scientific committees and juries for national and international contests on interior and spatial design organised by universities and institutions. Among these, he was one of the nine jury members of BIE (Bureau International des Expositions) for the Official Participants Awards Milan Expo 2015. Lately, he has been selected as one of the members of the scientific committee for the 3rd Architecture Exhibition of Pisa (Biennale) “The Time of Water” (2019).

In 2010, his works were mentioned in the encyclopedia entry “Allestire oggi – Progetti paradigmatici” (Exhibiting Today – Paradigmatic Projects) written by Italo Lupi and Beppe Finessi for the Treccani Italian Encyclopaedia of the 21st Century in the section dedicated to spaces and arts.

His son Tommaso is an ice hockey player; his daughter Carola is a fencing player.

Publication activity 
On the basis of his original research and professional activities, Ico Migliore has written articles and essays for many design and architecture journals, both in Italy and overseas, such as: Abitare, Domus, Interni, Wallpaper*, Frame, Axis, Bob and many others. 
His textual contributions on interior and spatial design, and exhibition design in particular, have appeared in several books. 
He is the author of several books about interior and spatial design, such as: “Time to Exhibit: Directing Spatial Design and New Narrative Pathways” (2019) edited by Franco Angeli; “Drawings by Ico Migliore. Sketches, Sceneries, Maps” (2019) edited by A&C Publishing; “Space Morphing Migliore + Servetto Temporary Architecture” (2007) edited by Five Continents.

Main works

Museums 
ADI Design Museum Compasso d’Oro, Milan, in progress
Layout of the "History of Mankind" section, Milan Natural History Museum, Milan (2019)
Logo and Corporate Identity, Miramare Historical Museum and Castle Park, Trieste (2019)
MIC-International Museum of the Shoe “Pietro Bertolini”, Vigevano, 2016
Leonardiana . A New Museum", Vigevano, 2016
Logo and Corporate Identity, Museo Egizio, Turin, 2014/2015
“A building site as an event”, Museo Egizio, Turin, 2012/2015
Pesaro City Art Museum, Palazzo Mosca, Pesaro, 2013
Intesa Sanpaolo Bank Savings Museum, Turin, 2012
Chopin Muzeum, Warsaw, 2010

Solo exhibitions 
As a result of more than 20 years of research in interior and spatial design, he has held several solo exhibitions, mainly with Migliore + Servetto Architects, including: 
“Lightmorphing. From Sign to Scenery” (2019) in South Korea at the Onground Gallery in Seoul and at the Art SoHyang Gallery in Busan;
“Red Light Architecture - Sketches and Notes on Projects” (2018) at the Dongdaemun Design Plaza (DDP) in Seoul (South Korea); 
“Spacemorphing” in Tokyo, Japan (2007), in Turin, Italy (2008), in Seoul, South Korea (2010).

Exhibitions 
Italian Pavilion “4 Elements / Taking Care”, Milan Triennial 2019 “Broken Nature: Design Takes on Human Survival”, Triennale di Milano, Milan (2019)
Abitare il Paese / Open Nests for CNAPPC (National Italian Council of Planners, Designers and Conservators), part of Interni "Human Spaces" exhibition at University of Milan for Fuori Salone - (Milan Furniture Fair), 2019
The Perfect Time for Whirlpool, part of Interni "Human Spaces" exhibition at University of Milan for Fuori Salone - (Milan Furniture Fair), 2019
Iulm 50. Legacy and Future, for IULM, Milan, 2019
La Magnifica Fabbrica. 240 Years of Teatro alla Scala from Piermarini to Botta, Museo Teatrale alla Scala, Milan, 2019 (together with I. Lupi)
Achille Castiglioni Visionary, Chiasso m.a.x museo, 2018
Michelangelo's Medici Madonna, for the Bank of Korea, Busan, 2018
Coats! Max Mara Seoul 2017, for Max Mara, Dongdaemun Design Plaza (DDP), Seoul, 2017
Steve Jobs o Visionário, Rio de Janeiro Pier Mauá and São Paulo Museum of Image and Sound, 2017
Madonna della Misericordia by Piero della Francesca, Palazzo Marino, Milan, 2016
The Art of Living, RCS, Palazzo della Permanente, Milan, 2016
B&B Italia / The Perfect Density, for B&B Italia, Triennale di Milano, Milan, 2016
In Equilibrio - HERB RITTS, Palazzo della Ragione, Milan, 2016
Bellissima. L'Italia dell'alta moda 1945–1968, Royal Villa of Monza, 2015
Moreschi Walking Pleasure, for Moreschi, Triennale di Milano, Milan, 2015
Tecno Lively Table, for Tecno, Piazza XXV Aprile, Milan, 2015
Alcantara Chromophone, Alcantara Technology of dreams, Palazzo Reale, Milan, 2015 (together with I. Lupi) 
RCS, The Art of Living, Triennale di Milano, Milan, 2015
Shooting Stars, LACMA, Los Angeles, 2015
Immortals – The Art and Knowledge of the Ancient Egyptians, Museo Egizio, Turin, 2013/2015
Trame – Copper Crossing in Contemporary Art, Design, Technology and Architecture, Triennale di Milano, Milan 2014
RCS, The Art of Living & Volvo Cloud Installation, Triennale di Milano, Milan, 2014
Meet Design: Around the World, Triennale di Milano, Milan, 2013
Pablo Picasso. Artworks from the Musee National Picasso in Paris at Palazzo Reale, Palazzo Reale, Milan, 2013 (together with I.Lupi)
Constancy & Change in Korean Traditional Craft, Triennale di Milano, Milan, 2013
Altagamma Italian Contemporary Excellence, Triennale di Milano, Milan, 2012/2013
Coats! Max Mara 60 Years of Italian Fashion. Travelling exhibition: Berlin Kulturforum (2006), Tokyo Mori Art Museum (2007), Beijing National Art Museum of China (NAMOC) (2008), Moscow State Historical Museum (2012)
Bticino Slim And White Axolute Code, Milan, 2010
Seeing The Light, for the New York Times Style Magazine, Bulgari Hotel, Milan, 2008
Sensidivini, Triennale di Milano, Milan, 2004
Drawing Dreams:  Dante Ferretti, Production Designer, LACMA, Los Angeles, 2002
Krizia Moving Shapes, Museum of Contemporary Art Tokyo (MOT), 2001 (together with I.Lupi)
Tod's Driving Dreams, Former Riva Workshops, Milan, 2001
Wallpaper* Urban Addition, Spazio Hogan, Milan, 2001
Wallpaper* + Giorgio Armani 60 Architecture Models, Former Nestlé Building, Milan, 2000

Fair design
space&interiors, for Made Expo, Milan, 2016 and 2017. Exhibition design of the entire fair area and of each individual stand
Puglia Crossing Identities, for MADE Expo, Milan 2017
Pedrali Urban Life, for Pedrali, Milan Furniture Fair, Milan, 2016
Accademia Citterio della Salumeria Italiana, for Citterio, Milan Expo 2015 Pavilion, Milan, 2015
Moreschi Caleidoscopes, Pitti Uomo Fair, Florence, 2015
Pedrali Light Frames, for Pedrali, Milan Furniture Fair, Milan, 2015
Luceplan Lighting Promenade, Milan Furniture Fair, Milan, 2015
Tecno stand, for Tecno, Caselli Piazza XXV Aprile, 2016, 2015 and 2014
Pedrali Stand Orgatec, for Pedrali, Orgatec Fair, Cologne, 2014
Pedrali Flying Boxes, for Pedrali, Milan Furniture Fair, Milan, 2014
Conai Stand, Ecomondo, Rimini, 2014
Tecno stand, for Tecno, Orgatec Fair, Cologne, 2014
Pedrali Mirror, for Pedrali, Milan Furniture Fair, Milan, 2013
Beijing Design Fair, for Rcs Media Group S.p.a, Watertank D·Park 751, Beijing, 2012. Exhibition design of the entire fair area and of each individual stands
A Wheel For Pedrali, for Pedrali, Milan Furniture Fair, Milan, 2012
Arper stand, for Arper, Milan Furniture Fair, Milan, 2009
Daedalus - 6 Ideas Scattered in a Technological Garden, Seoul Living Design Fair, Seoul, 2009
Foscarini stand, for Foscarini, Milan Furniture Fair, Milan, 2009
Fiat stand, Auto Show of Paris, Bologna, Geneva, 2008
Thonet stand, Milan Furniture Fair, Milan, 2004/2006
Charme Group Presentation (Poltrona Frau, Cappellini, Thonet, Gufram), Fuori Salone-Milan Furniture Fair, Milan, 2005
Conai stand, for Conai, at Ecomondo (Rimini Fair), IPACK-IMA (Rho Fair Milan), Iswa (Rome Fair) and Terra Futura (Florence). From 2003 to 2019

Interiors 
dmail (Percassi Group) new Headquarters, Pontassieve (Florence), 2019
dmail (Percassi Group) new Format Store, throughout Italy, 2016/2019
B&B Italia Charles 20° Anniversary, B&B Italia store, Milan, 2017
Mondadori Megastore, Il Centro Shopping Center, Arese, 2016
Mondadori new Concept Store, for Mondadori, 2015
Luceplan new Showroom, for Luceplan, Corso Monforte, Milan, 2014
SK Promotion Center, for SK Group, Beijing, 2013
Samsung Design Centre, for Samsung, Milan, 2012
BTicino Concept Store “Experience Space”, for BTicino, Milan, 2011
Mediabend Capital Headquarters, for Mediabend-Della Valle Group, New York, 2011
Banca Popolare Friuladria, Crédit agricole - Self Service Area, for Crédit Agricole FriulAdria S.p.a., Pordenone and Rovigo, 2008
Residence Desuite, Milan, 2006
Fay Concept Store, Milan, 2002

Urban design 
Blue Line Park, Busan, in progress
Expo Flags Boulevard and Palo Milano, for Milan Expo 2015, Milan, 2011/2015 (together with I.Lupi)
Torino + Light + Italian Colours, lighting Installation on the Mole Antonelliana, 2011/2012 (together with I.Lupi)
City Dressing for the 150th Anniversary of Italian Unification, Turin, 2011
City Dressing, Milan, 2010 
City Dressing, XXIII Winter Universiadi, Turin, 2007
Look of the City, XX Olympic Winter Game, Turin, 2006 (together with I.Lupi)
Corporate image and urban installations, Festival Dei Saperi, Pavia 2006/2008

Major awards 
XXV ADI Compasso d’Oro (Ita), 2018 - Permanent Exhibition, “Leonardiana. A New Museum”, Vigevano
Honorable Mention ADI Compasso d’Oro (Ita), 2018 - Temporary Exhibition, “Moreschi Walking Pleasure”
German Design Award (Ger), 2018 - Temporary Exhibition, “B&B Italia/The Perfect Density”
Red Dot Design Award (Ger), 2018 - Communication Design, “Coats! Max Mara, Seoul 2017” 
International Design Award (IDA) (US), 2016 - Product Design, "i-Mesh Lightweight Diffuser Ceilings"
Red Dot Design Award (Ger), 2016 - Communication Design, “Bellissima. L’Italia del’alta moda 1945-1968” 
Red Dot Design Award (Ger), 2016 - Communication Design, “Moreschi Walking Pleasure”
Red Dot Design Award (Ger), 2016 - Communication Design, “B&B Italia/The Perfect Density”
Red Dot Design Award (Ger), 2016 - Communication Design, “Pedrali Urban Life”
Red Dot Design Award (Ger), 2015 - Communication Design, "Pedrali Light Frames"
XXIII ADI Compasso d’Oro (Ita), 2014 - Event Design, “Slim and White Axolute Code”
Honorable Mention ADI Compasso d’Oro (Ita), 2014 - Permanent Exhibition, “Chopin Museum”
Honorable Mention ADI Compasso d’Oro (Ita), 2014 - Urban Design, “Torino + Light + Italian Colours”
FX International Interior Design Award (UK), 2012 - Temporary Exhibition, "A Wheel for Pedrali"
Honorable Mention ADI Compasso d’Oro (Ita), 2014 - Temporary Exhibition, “Seeing the Light” The New York Times Style Magazine
International Design Award (IDA) (US), 2011 - Temporary Installation, "Torino + Light + Italian Colours"
FX International Interior Design Award (UK), 2011 - Temporary Exhibition, “Seeing the Light” The New York Times Style Magazine
Red Dot Design Award (Ger), 2011 - Permanent Exhibition, “Chopin Muzeum”
Red Dot Design Award (Ger), 2011 - Communication Design, “Bticino Concept Store”
German Design Award (Ger), 2010 - Urban Design, “Look of the City. XX Olympic Winter Games 2006” 
Red Dot Design Award (Ger), 2009 - Communication Design, “Fiat Exhibition Stand 2008/2009”, Paris (France), Geneva (Switzerland)
Red Dot Design Award (Ger), 2009 - Communication Design, “Seeing the Light” The New York Times Style Magazine
Red Dot Design Award (Ger), 2009 - Communication Design, “Coats! Max Mara, 55 Years of Italian Fashion” Berlin (Germany), Tokyo (Japan), Beijing (China) 
XXI ADI Compasso d’Oro(Ita), 2008 - Urban Design, “Look of the City. XX Olympic Winter Games 2006” 
Honorable Mention ADI Compasso d’Oro (Ita), 2008 - Temporary Exhibition, “Wallpaper* Express. Da Pechino a Shanghai con Bombadier”
Annual Exhibit Design Award (US), 2006, Wallpaper* Exhibitions 1999/2003
Asal – Exhibition Design of the Year (Ita), 2003 - Temporary Exhibition, Wallpaper* “Urban Addition”

Sport 
Migliore played on the highest level  with HC Bolzano (1978–1980 and 1982–1983), HC Valpellice (1981–1982), Mastini Varese (1983–86)  and HC Milan Saima (1988–1990), two seasons in B, with Milan Saima (1986–88). He was the team captain of Mastini Varese and  HC Milan Saima.
He won two championships A1, both with Bolzano (1978–79 and 1982–83) and he gained two promotion with HC Valpellice and HC Milan Saima.
He was in the Italian national team for a long time (remarkable beginning with a goal on 20 February 1978 during a tune-up game lost 8–3 in Lugano against Switzerland B). He participated in Olympics (Sarajevo 1984), and four World Cup (one season in A - 1983; and three seasons in B - 1985,1986 e 1987). He won a bronze medal (1985) and a silver medal (1986) for.  In the World Cup at Canazei Migliore is the team's captain. He was awarded the bronze Medal of Sporting Honor by Italian National Olympic Committee.

Management 
Since he stopped playing, Migliore became a manager. He first worked with HC Milan Saima, until the dissolution in 1998. He continued with the temporary partnership between Milan Vipers and Cortina called SG Cortina-Milan, and then with Milan Vipers, in the capacity of deputy manager, Managing Director and Technical Manager, ten years long. With Milan Vipers he won 5 championships in a row, 3 Italy Cup e 3 Italian Super Cup, as well as a silver medal in Continental Cup in 2002.
After the Vipers’ dissolution by the president Alvise di Canossa, Migliore e Tiziano Terragni created 'Hockey Milan Rossoblu, which took up Vipers's legacy. The team started from A2 series, it then obtained the promotion in 2012, and came back in the Championship from 2012 to 2013 until now. In 2012 he was awarded the Region of Lombardy's Rosa Camuna for his engagement in sport's promotion. In 2014, he was awarded Ambrogino d'Oro for his role as the president of the Hockey Milan Rosso Blu.

References

External links

 Migliore+Servetto Architects
 Dexigner FX International Interior Design Awards
 http://www.milanosiamonoi.com/giocatori/migliore.php - Career Stats

1956 births
Living people
Bolzano HC players
HC Milano players
HC Valpellice players
HC Varese players
Ice hockey players at the 1984 Winter Olympics
Italian ice hockey forwards
Olympic ice hockey players of Italy
Sportspeople from Turin